Fyodor Fyodorovich Volkonsky, Merin (Russian, Фёдор Фёдорович Волко́нский ) (died 1665) was a Russian statesman and boyar who led the Russian units during the Siege of Belaya in 1634 in time of Smolensk War.  Voivode of Mtsensk in 1605. Son of Fedor Ivanovich Volkonsky, Merin :ru:Волконский, Фёдор Иванович Мерин.

References 

Fyodor Volkonsky in Brockhaus and Efron Encyclopedic Dictionary

Tsardom of Russia people
Khmelnytsky Uprising
Russian people of the Smolensk War
Russian people of the Russo-Polish War (1654–1667)
1665 deaths